East Fork Little Cimarron River is a tributary of the Little Cimarron River in Gunnison County, Colorado. The stream flows north from a source in the Uncompahgre National Forest to a confluence with the Little Cimarron River.

See also
List of rivers of Colorado
List of tributaries of the Colorado River

References

Rivers of Colorado
Rivers of Gunnison County, Colorado
Tributaries of the Colorado River in Colorado